Gates of Fire is an album released by American heavy metal band Manilla Road on October 12, 2005. It is divided into a trilogy: "The Frost's Giant Daughter", inspired by the story of the same name written by Robert E. Howard; "Out of the Ashes", based on Virgil's Aeneid; and "Gates of Fire", inspired by the stand of King Leonidas and his Spartans at the battle of Thermopylae.

Track listing 
All songs written by Mark Shelton.

The Frost Giant's Daughter 
 "Riddle of Steel" – 7:08
 "Behind the Veil" – 3:43
 "When Giants Fall" – 5:28

Out of the Ashes 
 "The Fall of Iliam" – 14:47
 "Imperious Rise" – 6:08
 "Rome" – 11:02

Gates of Fire 
 "Stand of the Spartans" – 5:36
 "Betrayal" – 8:26
 "Epitaph to the King" – 9:54

Credits 
 Mark Shelton – acoustic and electric guitars, vocals
 Cory Christner – drums
 Harvey Patrick – bass guitar
 Bryan Patrick – vocals

References

Manilla Road albums
2005 albums
Cultural depictions of Leonidas I
Works based on Conan the Barbarian
Works based on the Aeneid